Cholponbek Esenkul Uulu (born 15 January 1986) is a former Kyrgyzstani footballer who played as a striker.

Career statistics

International

Statistics accurate as of match played 5 September 2014

International Goals

References

External links

1986 births
Living people
Kyrgyzstani footballers
Kyrgyzstan international footballers
Kyrgyzstani expatriate footballers
Footballers at the 2014 Asian Games
Association football forwards
Asian Games competitors for Kyrgyzstan